"Just the Way It Is, Baby" is a song by American alternative rock duo the Rembrandts. Released in 1990 on the Atco Records label, it served as the debut single from their first album, The Rembrandts. It first appeared on the US Billboard Album Rock Tracks chart in 1990, then became a top-10 hit one year later in France, where it remained on the country's chart for 16 weeks, and in Austria and Germany. It was a moderate hit in other European countries, Australia, and Canada.

Track listings
7-inch single
 "Just the Way It Is, Baby" – 4:06
 "New King" – 2:42

CD single and 12-inch maxi
 "Just the Way It Is, Baby" – 4:06
 "LP Medley" – 7:50

CD maxi
 "Just the Way It Is, Baby" – 4:06
 "LP Medley" – 7:50
 "Just the Way It Is, Baby" (acoustic version) – 4:12

Charts

Weekly charts

Year-end charts

Cover versions
This song was covered by the South African band Little Sister under a slightly altered title "That's Just the Way It Is" on their album More Than Meets the Eye.

References

External links
 

1990 debut singles
1990 songs
Atco Records singles
The Rembrandts songs